Stephen Lawlor (born 1958 in Dublin) is an honours graduate of its National College of Art and Design from 1980-1983. During the 1980s he taught in Dún Laoghaire Institute of Art, Design and Technology Dublin, his work during this time was based on the figure of the horse which he developed through drawings etchings, lithographs and monotypes. An accomplished painter as well as a master printer, Lawlor has recently started to make sculpture in bronze. 
He has had solo shows in Ireland, England and the U.S.A. and has participated in numerous International Group exhibitions. His work is in private collections in the United States, Australia, The Far East and most of Europe.

He has been a member of Graphic Studio Dublin since 1984 and is its current Chairman.

Selected solo exhibitions
2006 Landscape, Hillsboro Fine Art, Dublin
2005 Hillsboro Fine Art, Dublin
2005 Graphic Studio Gallery, Dublin
2003 Recent Paintings Hillsboro Fine Art, Dublin
1997 Graphic Studio Gallery, Dublin
1997 Yello Gallery, Chicago
1997 Hillsborough Fine Art, Dublin
1993 Pantheon Gallery, Dublin
1990 Droichead Arts Centre, Drogheda
1990 Talent Store Gallery, London

Selected group exhibitions
2004 Paintings and Prints, Stockholm, Sweden
2002 Northern Ljus Stockholm, Sweden
2001 Galleri Hippo, Stockholm, Sweden
2000 Triennale Mondiale Paris, France
1999 Boyle Arts Festival, Roscommon
1999 R.H.A. Gallagher Gallery, Dublin
1999/8 The Original Print Fair, Royal Academy, London
1998 Irish Heritage, Hodges Taylor Gallery, Charlottesville, N. Carolina
1998 Art into Art, National Gallery, Dublin
1998 International Ex., Stockholm, Sweden
1998 5 Printmakers, Frank Lewis Gallery, Killarney
1997 The Original Print Fair, Royal Academy, London
1997 Trinnale Mondiale Chamalieres, France
1997 Out of Ireland, Keenesaw State University, Georgia, U.S.
1996 Yello Gallery, Cork
1995 The Print Initiative, (8 shows around Ireland)
1994 A Sense of Ireland, Hong Kong
1993 Dublin Graphics, Alvar Aalto Museum, Finland
1992 Edition One, Graphic Studio Gallery, Dublin
1991 European Large Format Printmaking, Guinness Hop Store, Dublin
1989 International Miniprint Exhibition, R.H.A. Gallery, Dublin
1989 Ernesto Besso Foundation, Rome
1986 A Sense of Ireland, Singapore
1985 Central Academy of  Fine Art, Beijing, China

Awards
1989 Award Winner, International Miniprint Exhibition, R.H.A. Gallery, Dublin
1989 Arts Council Travel Award, Finland
1993 Dept. of Foreign Affairs, Travel Award, Singapore
1997 Arts Council Travel Award, Chicago
1999 Print Award, Prizewinner, R.H.A. Dublin

Collections
Allied Irish Banks
Citibank
Gilbeys Ireland Ltd
Irish Computers
Irish Management Institute
Great Southern Hotels Group
 Dublin City University:
 Dark Horse (Hyperion)
Office of Public Works
Butler Gallery, Kilkenny
The Smurfit Group
The Hastings Group
Irish Intercontinental Bank
National Gallery Of Ireland

Irish artists
1958 births
Living people
Alumni of the National College of Art and Design